Trimeresurus macrops is a venomous pit viper species endemic to Southeast Asia. No subspecies are currently recognized. Common names include large-eyed pitviper and green pit viper.

Description
It can be distinguished from other green pit vipers by the relatively large size of its eyes, which is especially noticeable in adult specimens, and to which the specific name, macrops, refers.

Breeding
According to Strine, Green pit vipers mate during the end of the rainy season, between September and October. Female vipers will pull male vipers up the tree and begin mating.

Geographic range
It is found in Southeast Asia in northern Cambodia, Laos, Thailand, and southern Vietnam. The type locality given is "Bangkok, Thailand".

References

6. Strine, C (Strine, Colin)[ 1,3 ] ; Brown, A (Brown, Andrew)[ 2,3 ] ; Barnes, C (Barnes, Curt)[ 1,3 ] ; Major, T (Major, Tom)[ 4 ] ; Artchawakom, T (Artchawakom, Taksin)[ 3 ] ; Hill, J (Hill, Jacques, III)[ 5 ] ; Suwanwaree, P (Suwanwaree, Pongthep)[ 1 ]

Further reading
 Kramer, Eugen. 1977. Zur Schlangenfauna Nepals. Revue suisse de Zoologie 84 (3): 721–761.

External links
 

macrops
Reptiles described in 1977